The Uzbekistan Football Association is the governing body of football in Uzbekistan, controlling the Uzbekistan national team.

History
Uzbekistan Football Federation was founded in 1946, while Uzbekistan was still under Soviet rule, and has been a member of FIFA and the Asian Football Confederation since 1994.

On 7 January 2013, at a ceremony in Zurich, Switzerland, Uzbekistan football federation was awarded the prize FIFA Fair Play Award from FIFA. Uzbekistan Football Federation took also first place in points for the "Fair Play" among the AFC in 2012.

The federation organizes the Uzbek League, the second level Uzbekistan First League, Uzbekistan Second League, Uzbek Cup, UzPFL Cup and the Uzbek women's football championship.

The federation changed its nomenclature to Football Association in 2017.

Presidents

Association staff

Competitions

Men's

Women's

Current title holders

Awards
The Uzbekistan Football Association Awards Gala is an award ceremony hosted by The Football Association. The inaugural ceremony take place in December, in February or March before 2018. The 2015 Award ceremony took place on 20 February 2013.
The 2015 Award ceremony was held on 4 March 2016.

Player of the Year

Young Player of the Year

Coach of the Year

Youth Coach of the Year

Referee of the Year

Fair Play

References

External links
 Official website 
 Uzbekistan Football Federation at AFC.com 
 Uzbekistan profile at FIFA.com

Football in Uzbekistan
1946 establishments in Uzbekistan
Uzbekistan
Football
Sports organizations established in 1946